South East Radio is an Irish radio station based in County Wexford, broadcasting at 95.6; 96.2, and 96.4 MHz. The station also broadcasts on the same frequencies into adjoining counties - including Wicklow, Carlow, Kilkenny and Waterford. South East Radio's studios are in a 19th-century Georgian-styled former bank branch, located on the quays of Wexford Town.

History
Originally operating as a pirate radio station under the name 'Slaneyside', those responsible for the station successfully bid for a single available broadcast licence during the late 1980s. The winning consortium (who were in competition with another pirate station named "Community Radio Wexford") were awarded the licence following an application and oral presentation. These were given in Waterford on 27 April 1989. The station launched on 20 October 1989. The station was initially assigned 99.2FM by the then Independent Radio and Television Commission (IRTC), as this frequency was assigned to Mount Leinster. The station changed its name from 'Slaneyside' to 'South East Radio' during the summer of 1989 - prior to the launch. RTÉ broadcaster Noel Andrews joined the organisation briefly to assist in the setting up the station.

The station started broadcasting on a 24-hour-a-day basis on 2 December 1989.  South East Radio moved to 95.6 MHz before the launch of RTÉ Lyric FM.

As of 2018, the South East Radio is overseen by managing director Eamonn Buttle, who had been an original founder of the station in 1989.

References

External links
 South East Radio Official Website

Former pirate radio stations
Pirate radio stations in Ireland
Mass media in County Wexford
Radio stations in the Republic of Ireland
Wexford, County Wexford
Radio stations established in 1989